Rostam-e Do Rural District is a rural district (dehestan) in the Central District of Rostam County, Fars Province, Iran. At the 2006 census, its population was 6,864, in 1,338 families.  The rural district has 34 villages.

References 

Rural Districts of Fars Province
Rostam County